de Santana may refer to:

 Gabriel Donizete de Santana (born 1987), Brazilian midfielder
 Hernando de Santana, Spanish conqueror
 Reginaldo de Santana (born 1975), Brazilian football player

See also

 Santana (disambiguation)